St. Martin's Church is a historic Episcopal Church (United States) church at 50 Orchard Avenue in Providence, Rhode Island.  It is located next door to Temple Beth-El, a Reform Synagogue.

The congregation was established in 1885 and the Gothic Revival church building was constructed in 1917 to a design by Clarke & Howe to replace an earlier wooden building.  It is a granite structure with a squat square three-stage tower at its southeast corner.  The parish house, attached to the main building's northeast corner, is a Tudor Revival structure added in 1925.

The church was added to the National Register of Historic Places in 1996.

Stained glass window
The church features a stained glass window scene of namesake St. Martin cutting off half of his cloak to give to a beggar. The windows of the church were designed by Boston window designer Harry E. Goodhue and his wife, Mary, and installed in 1919. A restoration of the windows was undertaken by an Attleboro studio, New England Stained Glass, during the winter of 2014–2015. The entire window was removed from the wall, then individual pieces were removed, cleaned, reassembled, and re-leaded onto new metal frames.

See also
National Register of Historic Places listings in Providence, Rhode Island

References

External links

Official website

Episcopal churches in Rhode Island
Churches completed in 1917
20th-century Episcopal church buildings
Churches on the National Register of Historic Places in Rhode Island
National Register of Historic Places in Providence, Rhode Island
1917 establishments in Rhode Island